The Ciudad Deportiva del Granada CF, is the training ground of the Spanish football club Granada CF, located in Granada, Spain. It occupies an area of 75,535 m2.

The 1st phase of the training centre occupying an area of 47,833m², was completed earlier in 2015. The 2nd phase will occupy an area of 27,702 m2. The total cost of the project will some around € 8.5 million.

Facilities
The Central Stadium of the Ciudad Deportiva with a capacity of 2,000 seats is currently under construction. It will also serve as the home ground of Recreativo Granada; the reserve team of Granada CF.
3 full-size natural grass pitches.
1 full-size artificial turf pitch
1 seven-a-side football natural grass pitch.
Service centre with gymnasium.

References

External links
Ciudad Deportiva del Granada CF
Estadios de España 
The design of Ciudad Deportiva del Granada CF
Photos of Ciudad Deportiva del Granada CF

Granada CF
Granada
Sports venues completed in 2015